The 1967 NAIA football season was the 12th season of college football sponsored by the NAIA.

The season was played from August to November 1967, culminating in the 1967 NAIA Championship Bowl, played this year on December 9, 1967 at Mountaineer Field in Morgantown, West Virginia.

Fairmont State defeated  in the Championship Bowl, 28–21, to win their first NAIA national title.

Conference realignment

Conference changes
 The Montana Collegiate Conference was renamed as the Frontier Conference.

Conference standings

Postseason

See also
 1967 NCAA University Division football season
 1967 NCAA College Division football season

References

 
NAIA Football National Championship